"The Craziest Thing" is a song recorded by Canadian country music artist Rick Tippe. It was released in 1996 as the first single from his second studio album, Get Hot or Go Home. It peaked at number 9 on the RPM Country Tracks chart in January 1997.

Chart performance

References

1996 songs
1996 singles
Rick Tippe songs